Sarcocheilichthys biwaensis is a species of cyprinid fish endemic to Lake Biwa in Japan.

References

Sarcocheilichthys
Fish described in 1982
Taxa named by Kazumi Hosoya